Perth Castle was a 9th-century castle in Perth, Scotland. The Danes attacked the castle in the 9th century.

A motte-and-bailey castle was built in the 12th century. The castle was once a royal residence. King Malcolm IV of Scotland was besieged at the castle in 1160 by Ferchar, Earl of Strathearn, and five other earls. A flood in 1209 damaged the castle and it became the residence of the Scottish Kings after the destruction of the Royal Palace in 1210. A further flood in 1290 damaged the motte mound and required the castle to be rebuilt. The castle was surrendered to the English in 1296. Reverting to Scottish control, King Edward I of England captured the castle in 1298, 1300 and 1303. Besieged in 1306 and 1309 by Scottish forces, it withheld the sieges. It was captured in 1309 by Scottish forces and then by English forces in 1311. The castle was captured by King Robert I of Scotland on 8 January 1313, who ordered the walls and castle to be destroyed. This was done to prevent the castle being used again by English forces garrisoning the castle against Scotland. Nothing remains above ground.

See also
Gowrie House
Spey Tower

References

Further reading

External links
https://thecastleguy.co.uk/castle/perth-castle/

Castles in Perth, Scotland
Demolished buildings and structures in Scotland
Former castles in Scotland
9th-century establishments in Scotland
9th century in Scotland
14th-century disestablishments in Scotland
Scotland in the High Middle Ages
Royal residences in Scotland
9th-century fortifications